Sir Julian Ernest Michael Le Grand, FBA (born 29 May 1945) is a British academic specialising in public policy. He is the Richard Titmuss Professor of Social Policy at the London School of Economics (LSE) and was a senior policy advisor to former Prime Minister Tony Blair.

Le Grand is the author, co-author or editor of seventeen books and over ninety articles on economics, philosophy and public policy. One of his books, Motivation, Agency and Public Policy: Of Knights and Knaves, Pawns and Queens, was described by The Economist as "accessible – and profound" and by The Times as "one of the most important books on public policy in recent years".  He was one of Prospect magazine's 100 top British public intellectuals, and one of the ESRC's ten Heroes of Dissemination.

He is one of the principal architects of the UK Government's current ‘quasi-market’ reforms introducing choice and competition into health care and education. In addition, he originated and developed several innovative ideas in social policy, including one that became the ‘baby bond’ or Child Trust Fund, the Partnership Scheme for funding long term care endorsed by the 2005 Wanless Report Securing Good Care for Older People, the Educational Premium for the less well off and for looked after children, and the Social Care Practice in the 2006 Department for Education and Skills Green Paper, Care Matters.

Le Grand was one of the signatories of a letter published in The Guardian on 15 April 2008, which criticised the UK Government's "retreat in the face of a rightwing challenge over inheritance tax". Le Grand and his co-authors argued that inheritance tax "is one of the few tools which directly reduces inherited inequalities."

In 2014 he was a member of the Commission on the Future of Health and Social Care in England for the King's Fund, chaired by Kate Barker which delivered its final report in September.  He subsequently denounced the proposal of increasing NHS charges, which he described as a zombie idea.

Honours
In 2006 Le Grand was awarded an honorary doctorate (D.Litt.) by the University of Sussex.

In 2007 Le Grand was made a Fellow of the Royal Society of Arts.

In 2012, Le Grand was elected Fellow of the British Academy (FBA).

In the 2015 New Year Honours, he  was knighted 'for services to social science and public service'.

Works
He has written widely, including:
 The Economics of Social Problems, Palgrave Macmillan, 2008 http://www.palgrave.com/products/title.aspx?PID=280559
 The Other Invisible Hand: Delivering Public Services Through Choice and Competition, Princeton University Press, 2007
 Motivation, Agency and Public Policy: Of Knights and Knaves, Pawns and Queens, Oxford University Press, 2003, pp. 208,  – argues in favor of increasing tax choice
 "Health, Values & Social Policy". In Ann Oakley & Jonathan Barker, Private Complaints & Public Health, Policy Press, 2004
Quasi-Markets and Social Policy (Ed with Will Bartlett), Macmillan, 1993
Market Socialism (Ed with Saul Estrin), Clarendon Press, 1989

Notes

External links
Experts at the London School of Economics – Professor Julian Le Grand
  / Financial Times

Academics of the London School of Economics
Living people
1945 births
Knights Bachelor
Fellows of the British Academy
Members of the Fabian Society